"Dust Clears" is a song by British electronic group Clean Bandit, featuring chorus vocals by Noonie Bao and mainly sung by band member Jack Patterson. The song was released on 19 July 2013 as the third single from their debut album, New Eyes. The song peaked at number 43 on the UK Singles Chart and number 14 on the UK Dance Chart.

Music video
A music video to accompany the release of "Dust Clears" was first released onto YouTube on 19 June 2013 at a total length of four minutes and fifty seconds. Talking about the video Clean Bandit said "We created and filmed the video ourselves completely and had an amazing time shooting it on a frozen lake in Sweden (Lake Vattern). Two of Jack's friends from film school who helped us make the Mozart's House video came to Sweden to help with this one too: Anna Patarakina and Daria Novitskaya. Big thank you to them and Nick Martin, the skater featured in the video." The video was filmed, directed and produced by Clean Bandit.

The video contains a reference to the painting by Henry Raeburn of The Skating Minister, portrayed by Nick Martin who dressed in the same clothes and copied the exact pose as in the painting at one point in the video.

Nick Martin is an artist and teacher who lives on the Isle of Wight. He also appears in another Clean Bandit video ("Rather Be"). The band and Nick came up with the concept of the "skating Minister" together.

Track listing

Charts

Release history

References

2013 singles
2013 songs
Clean Bandit songs
Warner Music Group singles
Songs written by Jimmy Napes
Songs written by Grace Chatto
Songs written by Jack Patterson (Clean Bandit)